Mikko Innanen  may refer to:
Mikko Innanen (footballer)
Mikko Innanen (musician)